Abdul Kareem Fakir (born December 26, 1935), professionally known as Duke Fakir, is an American singer.  He is a founding member of the Motown quartet the Four Tops, from 1953 to the present day.  A first tenor, Fakir is the group's lone surviving original member, performing today with Ronnie McNeir, Lawrence "Roquel" Payton Jr. (son of original member Lawrence Payton), and Alexander Morris.

Biography

Fakir was born on December 26, 1935, in Detroit, Michigan.  His father was a factory worker who came from what is now Bangladesh.

Fakir attended Detroit's Pershing High School, where he played basketball, football, and ran track.

He first met fellow band member Levi Stubbs through neighborhood football games, even though he was not aware Stubbs was a singer. Later, attending a variety show featuring the Lucky Millinder band, the band announced a talented young singer who Fakir recognized as the boy he played football with. They became closer friends and Stubbs even traveled with Fakir to his sporting events, where they enjoyed singing and engaging teammates in sing-a-longs.

With their shared love of singing, they tried a few other singers then decided to ask Lawrence Payton and Renaldo "Obie" Benson. They invited Payton and Benson to join them at a party hosted by the Shahrazads, a local "it girl" club. When invited by the girls to sing, they decided Stubbs would take the lead and they would back him up. The group and party-goers enjoyed their sound so much, that they decided to begin rehearsing together.

They originally gave themselves the name "The Four Aims", to describe their goals of achieving something great. But at their first recording session with Chess Records in Chicago, they were reminded that the singing quartet, the Ames Brothers, was a very popular group, and it was suggested that they change their name. After some discussion, their musical director Maurice King suggested the name the Four Tops, to go along with their original goal of shooting for the stars and reaching the top. They became a popular local performing group but recording success eluded them until they signed with the newly established Motown Records in 1963. They soon became one of the biggest recording groups of the sixties, with 14 charted hits through until the early eighties. They are listed in Billboard Magazines "Top 100 Artists Of All Time".

Fakir was a guest on the "Not My Job" segment of the NPR radio show Wait Wait…Don’t Tell Me taped at the Fox Theater in Detroit, Michigan on Thursday, January 19, 2012, and broadcast on January 21, 2012.

In 2022, Fakir was featured in an Associated Press Q&A article and video in which he discusses his memoir called “I’ll Be There: My Life With The Four Tops” (published May 5, 2022 by Omnibus Press), and musical based on his life and the story of The Four Tops, expected to debut in Detroit in 2022 and then on Broadway in 2023.

Awards and achievements
As a member of the Four Tops Fakir was inducted into the Rock and Roll Hall of Fame in 1990, received a star on the Hollywood Walk of Fame in 1997, was inducted into the Vocal Group Hall of Fame 1999, the Grammy Hall of Fame in 1998, received the Grammy Life Achievement Award in 2009, and was included in the Billboard Magazine Top 100 Recording Artists of All Time.

Personal life
Fakir resides in the Palmer Park section of Detroit.  He and his wife, Piper, have been married for 42 years.  He has seven children, seven grandchildren, and one great-grandchild.

Fakir attributes his upbringing in Detroit as a strong influence in his choice to pursue his music career. Detroit is "full of churches. It's one of those cities in which gospel music has always been prevalent, jazz music had always been prevalent. Back in the day this was a jazz town... And when I was born we went to church, just like a couple of the other guys, so we sang all our lives pretty much... my mother worked at church and my cousins and I, we all went to choir, we grew up there."

Both Benson and Fakir received scholarships to attend the same college and were preparing to enter. However, the group received their first professional singing engagement during that summer in 1954 at Eddie's Lounge in Flint, MI, took a gamble, and decided to pursue their music career instead.

Fakir was close friends with fellow Motown artist Mary Wilson of the Supremes for over 50 years up until her death in 2021. The two were romantically linked and briefly engaged in 1964; however, their music careers were still developing and they decided it would be best to call it off. They appeared on Chicago's You and Me This Morning in 2013 to promote the Mary Wilson Holiday Spectacular With Special Guests The Four Tops  At the show they performed "Baby, It's Cold Outside" together.

In January 2023 it was reported the U.S. Department of Treasury is seeking $500,000 in unpaid taxes from Fakir.

References

External links

Abdul 'Duke' Fakir interview by Pete Lewis, 'Blues & Soul' February 2010

1935 births
Living people
American people of Bangladeshi descent
American soul singers
American tenors
Four Tops members
American rhythm and blues singers
American male singers
Singers from Detroit
Pershing High School alumni